Greatest Hits: The Show Dog Years is the fourth greatest hits album by American country music artist Toby Keith. It was released in October 25.2019 via Show Dog Nashville.

Track listing

Personnel on New Tracks (1, 6, 15)
Adapted from liner notes.

Jimmy Bowland - saxophone (track 15)
Perry Coleman - background vocals (track 1)
Nickie Conley - background vocals (track 15)
Mark Douthit - saxophone (track 15)
Scotty Emerick - acoustic guitar (track 6)
Jason Eskridge - background vocals (track 15)
Ian Fitchuk - bass guitar (track 6), drums (track 6)
Mike Haynes - trumpet (track 15)
Evan Hutchings - drums (tracks 1, 15)
Jeff Hyde - acoustic guitar (tracks 1, 15)
Toby Keith - lead vocals
Tim Lauer - keyboards (track 6)
Sam Levine - saxophone (track 15)
Mills Logan - percussion (track 1)
Brent Mason - electric guitar (track 1)
Mac McAnally - acoustic guitar (tracks 6, 15), piano (track 6)
Maureen Murphy - background vocals (track 15)
Steve Patrick - trumpet (track 15)
Justin Ostrander - electric guitar (track 15)
Russ Pahl - steel guitar (track 1)
Matt Rollings - piano (tracks 6, 15), Wurlitzer (track 15)
F. Reid Shippen - percussion, programming (track 15)
Jimmie Lee Sloas - bass guitar (tracks 1, 15)
Bergen White - brass arrangements (track 15)

Chart performance

References

2019 greatest hits albums
Toby Keith compilation albums
Show Dog-Universal Music compilation albums